William Glen Schnebel (May 7, 1924 – December 9, 2002) was an American football coach. He served as the head football coach at the College of Emporia in Emporia, Kansas from 1956 to 1964 and Northwestern State College—now known as Northwestern Oklahoma State University—in Alva, Oklahoma from 1965 to 1967, compiling career college football coaching record of 75–39–2. Schnebel was named the "Little All-American Coach of the Year" in 1960 and NAIA coach of the year in 1962.

Coaching career

College of Emporia
Schnebel's first head coaching job was at the College of Emporia in Emporia, Kansas. While head coach of the Fighting Presbies, he led his teams to a record of 62–23–1. They won Kansas Collegiate Athletic Conference title three years (1959, 1962, and 1963), took second place in the conference twice (1956 and 1961), and third place in his final season at the college (1964).

Schnebel's team traveled to the Mineral Water Bowl in 1959 and defeated , 21–20. In 1962 C of E was ranked number 3 in the NAIA and lost in the semifinal game to Central State, 20–0. In 1963 C of E was ranked 2nd in the NAIA and lost in the semifinal game to Saint John's, 54–0.

Northwest Oklahoma State
After his term at the College of Emporia, Schnebel was named the head football coach at Northwestern State College—now known as Northwestern Oklahoma State University—in Alva, Oklahoma.

Death
Schnebel died on December 9, 2002, in Alva.

Head coaching record

References

1924 births
2002 deaths
College of Emporia Fighting Presbies football coaches
Northwestern Oklahoma State Rangers football coaches
People from Alva, Oklahoma
People from Fremont, Nebraska